University of Rajasthan is a public and state university in Jaipur, Rajasthan, India and is one of the oldest universities in the state. It was set up on 8 January 1947 as the University of Rajputana and was given its current name in 1956.

Campus

The university has always accorded a high priority to games and sports. The university has a modern sports complex, and also a swimming pool, the latter has been the venue of many national swimming meets and inter university-national tournaments.

Organisation and administration

Affiliated colleges 
Its jurisdiction extends over the two districts Dausa and Jaipur. , University of Rajasthan has published a list of 255 Affiliated Colleges.

Constituent colleges 
 University Commerce College
 University Maharani College
 University Maharaja College
 University Five Year Law College
 University Law College
 University Law College CENTRE-II
 University Rajasthan College

Notable alumni

Arts, cinema And literature 
 Ramkumar Singh : Journalist, fiction writer and screenwriter

Politics and law

Science, technology and medicine

Sports

References

External links 
 

 

 
Universities and colleges in Jaipur
Universities in Rajasthan
Educational institutions established in 1947
1947 establishments in India